"Ein Haus voll Glorie schauet" (A house full of glory looks) is a popular German Catholic hymn, frequently sung for the consecration of churches (Kirchweihe) and their anniversaries. Text and tune were created by Joseph Mohr in 1875. It was changed for the version in the Catholic hymnal Gotteslob (GL 478), with stanzas two to five written by Hans W. Marx in 1972. It has inspired musical settings for festive occasions such as the millennium of the Bamberg Cathedral.

History 
Born Joseph Hermann Mohr in Siegburg in 1834 the son of a teacher, the hymn writer was a member of the Society of Jesus from 1853, and a priest from 1866. Before his consecration as a priest, he was president of the Marianische Kongregation and responsible for music (Musikpräfekt). He published a hymnal which was succeeded by his hymnal Cäcilia, which appeared in 1936 in the 36th edition. He devoted his life to the singing in church, publishing Manuale cantorum (Cantors' manual) and the hymnal Cantate, which first contained "Ein Haus voll Glorie schauet".

The Society of Jesus was persecuted by Bismarck's Jesuits Law (1872). Therefore, Mohr had left Germany when he wrote text and melody of the hymn, possibly in 1875. He may have been inspired by the Michaelsberg Abbey on a mountain overlooking his hometown. Published in 1876, the song is regarded as an example of opposition by the church (kirchlicher Widerstand), transferring the style of contemporary patriotic songs to a hymn. It became popular soon, and is still his most popular creation.

The song is a confession of faith, and a procession song, proclaiming Catholic identity. The text provides powerful images of a Catholic church which had to recover after the 1803 German mediatization. Heinrich Peters says that the original hymn corresponds to the Church's identity from the First Vatican Council in 1870. Mohr's hymn became known locally as the Siegburg Hymne.

After the Second Vatican Council, Peters says that several of Mohr's formulas and the exclusivism of his ecclesiology were regarded as dated. A new focus on proclaiming the Gospel to the world was wanted. Hans W. Marx wrote four more stanzas for the Catholic hymnal Gotteslob of 1975, of which the last three appeared with Mohr's first. All his stanzas, with Mohr's first, are now part of the second edition of Gotteslob of 2013, as GL 478.

First stanza 

Ein Haus voll Glorie schauet
Weit über alle Land',
Aus ew'gem Stein erbauet
Von Gottes Meisterhand.
Gott! wir loben dich;
Gott! wir preisen dich;
O laß im Hause dein
Uns all geborgen sein!

Melody and settings 
The hymnic melody, reminiscent of a Prussian military march, is suitable for festive occasions and processions. The last lines were originally a refrain: "Gott, wir loben dich, Gott, wir preisen dich. O lass im Hause dein uns all geborgen sein" (God, we laud You, God, we praise You. O let us be sheltered in your house). Their melody moves up and forward.

In 2012 Christopher Tambling composed a setting of the hymn to celebrate the 1000th anniversary of Bamberg Cathedral. Tambling's version was for choir, orchestra and organ, with different scoring in the five stanzas. Naji Hakim wrote in 2017 variations on the hymn for organ for the 50th anniversary of St. Nikolaus in Bergen-Enkheim.

References

Literature 
 Michael Hölscher, C. Mönkehues: "Heilig, Herr der Himmelsheere?!" Problematische Bilderwelten in Psalmen und Kirchenliedern. Material zur Bibelarbeit beim 97. Deutschen Katholikentag in Osnabrück. S. 10–12 (online).
 Rebecca Schmidt: Gegen den Reiz der Neuheit. Katholische Restauration im 19. Jahrhundert. Heinrich Bone, Joseph Mohr, Guido Maria Dreves (Mainzer hymnologische Studien Band 15). Francke, Tübingen 2002,  ( – dazu Rezension von Michael Fischer in Lied und populäre Kultur – Song and Popular Culture. Jahrbuch des Deutschen Volksliedarchivs, 49. Jahrgang. Waxmann, Münster 2004, pp 263 f.).
 Meinrad Walter: "Ich lobe meinen Gott …" 40 Gotteslob-Lieder vorgestellt und erschlossen. Herder, Freiburg i. Br. 2015, .

External links 
 Ein Haus voll Glorie schauet ... Cäcilia, 13 July 2011

19th-century hymns in German
Catholic hymns in German
1876 songs